Cyril of Beloozero (Cyril of Beloezero,  - Kirill Belo(e)zersky; 1337 – 1427) was a monk and saint of the Russian Orthodox Church who lived in the 15th century. Saint Cyril was a disciple of Saint Sergius of Radonezh. In 1397, he founded the Kirillo-Belozersky Monastery in Northern Russia, in the present-day Vologda Oblast.

Biography

Cyril was born as Kosma in Moscow in 1337. His origin is not entirely clear, but he was in any case close to the boyar family of Velyaminov. Cyril's parents died when he was a child. Around 1380 he became a monk in the Simonov Monastery and took the name of Cyril (Kirill). In the monastery, he got in contact with Sergius of Radonezh. In 1387, the archimandrite of the Simonov Monastery, Feodor, was appointed a bishop of Rostov, and Cyril became his successor. However, he soon realized that the position of archimadrite required too much involvement in public affairs, and first resigned, then moved to a neighboring monastery as an ordinary monk, and then decided to move to a deserted place where he could pray in peace. Together with St. Therapont, previously the monk of the same monastery, Cyril left for Lake Beloye. On arrival, following the advice of Sergius of Radonezh, he first dug a cave, and then built a wooden Assumption chapel and a loghouse for other monks. Therapont, who found the restriction imposed by Cyril too strict, left within a year and founded nearby the Ferapontov Monastery. In what became Kirillo-Belozersky Monastery, Cyril established a very strict order.

The monastery grew and later became the largest monastery of Northern Russia. Cyril, as the first hegumen, arranged purchases of large areas of land by the monastery.

Cyril of White Lake died in the monastery in 1427, at the age of ninety. Makaryev Sobors of the Russian Orthodox Church recognized him as a saint in 1547.
At present there are several churches in Russia bearing the name of Cyril.

His day is marked by Russian Orthodox Church on June 9.

References

Russian saints of the Eastern Orthodox Church
1337 births
1427 deaths
15th-century Christian saints